Deeringia is a genus of flowering plants in the amaranth family Amaranthaceae. Its native range is tropical Asia, western Pacific, Australia and Madagascar.

Species
, Plants of the World Online accepted the following species:

References

Amaranthaceae
Amaranthaceae genera
Taxa named by Robert Brown (botanist, born 1773)